The Manchester Express was a free newspaper serving Manchester, New Hampshire, United States. The paper began publication as The Manchester Daily Express on May 22, 2006, and was published five days a week until February 27, 2008. The paper was then published on a weekly basis. The January 4, 2009, issue was the final issue.

Modeled on free daily commuter papers in larger cities, publisher Jody Reese wrote in a front-page article on the final day of daily production that the paper was unable to generate enough advertisement revenue to support daily publication. The paper also laid off two employees.

The Manchester Express was owned by Quality of Life Publications, the parent company of Hippo Press, which also produces the free arts and entertainment weekly paper, The Hippo, and other local publications.

The Express was printed at the presses of Foster's Daily Democrat. The paper had a circulation of 12,000 in 2006.

References

External links
 Official website
 Concord Monitor: Manchester's second daily paper debuts
 Manchester Daily Express, Feb. 27, 2008. Daily Express changes to weekly schedule, tomorrow.
 Manchester Daily Express, Jan. 4, 2009. Manchester Express publishes final edition.

Manchester, New Hampshire
Newspapers published in New Hampshire
Hillsborough County, New Hampshire